Walter Posner (born 22 February 1953) is a retired German football player. He spent seven seasons in the Bundesliga with Borussia Mönchengladbach and Bayer 04 Leverkusen.

Honours
 UEFA Cup winner: 1974–75
 Bundesliga champion: 1974–75

References

External links
 

1953 births
Living people
German footballers
Borussia Mönchengladbach players
Bayer 04 Leverkusen players
Bundesliga players
2. Bundesliga players
Association football defenders